The Faithful City is a 1952 American drama film directed by Józef Lejtes and written by Józef Lejtes and Ben Barzman. The film stars Jamie Smith, Ben Josef, John Slater, Rahel Marcus, Dina Doron and Didi Ramati. The film was released on April 7, 1952, by RKO Pictures.

Plot

Cast 
Jamie Smith as Sam
Ben Josef as Davidel
John Slater as Ezra
Rahel Marcus as Sarah
Dina Doron as Anna 
Didi Ramati as Tamar
Israel Hanin as Max
Juda Levi as Joan
Amnon Lifshitz

References

External links
 

1952 films
American black-and-white films
RKO Pictures films
1952 drama films
American drama films
1950s English-language films
1950s American films